Alexander Aleksandrovich Goldenweiser ( – July 6, 1940) was a Russian-born U.S. anthropologist and sociologist.

Biography 

Alexander Alexandrovich Goldenweiser was born in Kiev, Ukraine, in 1880. He emigrated to the United States in 1900. He studied anthropology under Franz Boas, and earned his AB degree from Columbia University in 1902, his AM degree in 1904, and his Ph.D. in 1910.

In addition to many books, articles, and reviews, Professor Goldenweiser taught at the following institutions: Lecturer, Anthropology, Columbia University, 1910–1919; New School for Social Research, NY, 1919–1926; Lecturer, Rand School of Social Science, 1915–1929; Professor, Thought and Culture, Oregon State System of Higher Education, Portland Extension, 1930–1938; Visiting Professor, University of Wisconsin–Madison, 1937–1938; Professor, University of Washington, 1923; Visiting Professor of Sociology, Reed College, 1933-1939.

Among his other contributions, Goldenweiser introduced the term "involution" to social sciences research. It was applied by Clifford Geertz in his Agricultural Involution.

He died on July 6, 1940, in Portland, Oregon.

Works 
 Totemism; An analytical study, 1910
 Early civilization, An Introduction to Anthropology, 1922
 Robots or Gods, 1931
 Anthropology, An Introduction to Primitive Culture, 1937
 History, psychology and culture, 1937

Notable student 
 Dr B. R. Ambedkar, chief architect of the Constitution of India (14 April 1891- 6 December 1956)

Further reading
 Goldenweiser, Alexander. History Psychology, and Culture (1933).
 Kan, Sergei. A Maverick Boasian: The Life and Work of Alexander A. Goldenweiser. U of Nebraska Press, 2023.

References

External links
 

American sociologists
Columbia University faculty
Anthropology writers
American people of Ukrainian-Jewish descent
Columbia College (New York) alumni
1880 births
1940 deaths
Ukrainian Jews
Jewish anthropologists
20th-century American anthropologists

Columbia Graduate School of Arts and Sciences alumni
Emigrants from the Russian Empire to the United States